Ira Oberberg (born Ira Bugajenko; 25 May 1918) is a German former film editor. Born in Moscow, the daughter of theatrical parents, she moved to Berlin at a young age. She was the half-sister of the cinematographer Igor Oberberg.

Selected filmography
 Sky Hounds (1942)
 Love Premiere (1943)
 The Green Salon (1944)
 The Enchanted Day (1944)
 White Gold (1949)
 No Way Back (1953)
 Knall and Fall as Detectives (1953)
 Have Sunshine in Your Heart (1953)
 A Double Life (1954)
 The Beginning Was Sin (1954)
 You Can No Longer Remain Silent (1955)
 Love Without Illusions (1955)
 Master of Life and Death (1955)
 Love (1956)
 My Father, the Actor (1956)
 A Heart Returns Home (1956)
 Man in the River (1958)
 Mädchen in Uniform (1958)
 My Ninety Nine Brides (1958)
 Crime After School (1959)
 Mistress of the World (1960)
 Until Money Departs You (1960)
 The Dead Eyes of London (1961)
 Our House in Cameroon (1961)
 Sherlock Holmes and the Deadly Necklace (1962)
 Jack and Jenny (1963)

References

Bibliography
 Greco, Joseph. The File on Robert Siodmak in Hollywood, 1941-1951. Universal-Publishers, 1999.

External links
 

1918 births
Possibly living people
Film people from Berlin
German film editors
Soviet emigrants to Germany